Tech University of Korea (TU Korea), formerly Korea Polytechnic University (KPU), is a polytechnic university in South Korea. KPU was established in 1998 by support from the Ministry of Commerce, Industry and Energy.

Located in Siheung-si, Gyeonggi-do. It was established to cultivate professional technical manpower with strong field adaptability through practical training.

The abbreviation in English is KPU, and the abbreviation in Korean is Sangidae (산기대). As a university established by the Government, the proportion of research and laboratory practice is considerably large. In addition, the lab is open to undergraduate students to create and operate an engineering house, a space where professors, graduate students, corporate researchers, and undergraduate students can study together.

In early 2007, the Techno Innovation Park was opened to accommodate approximately 1,400 residents and more than 40 engineering houses, ranging from 17 floors above ground to 1 underground.

Organization 
All departments, except the department of design and business administration, are engineering colleges, and there are no separate colleges, and three graduate schools are established: general graduate school, graduate school of knowledge-based technology and energy (specialized graduate school), and graduate school of industrial technology (specialized graduate school). Korea's first game engineering department, which specializes in game development, was established in 2002. In addition, the Faculty of Industry-Academy Cooperation has been established for customized re-education required by industry. An eight-week, four-semester system was implemented from the beginning of the school's 1998 to 2000.  As of 2019, there are 6,879 undergraduate students, 351 master's students, and 58 doctoral students.

References

External links
 

Universities and colleges in Gyeonggi Province
Educational institutions established in 1998
1998 establishments in South Korea
Siheung